Wa (also waa or wah, abbreviated ) is a unit of length, equal to two metres (2 m) or four sok (.) Wa as a verb means to outstretch (one's) arms to both sides, which relates to the fathom's distance between the fingertips of a man's outstretched arms. The 1833 Siamese-American Treaty of Amity and Commerce, reads, "[The] Siamese fathom...being computed to contain 78 English or American inches, corresponding to 96 Siamese inches." The length then would have been equivalent to a modern 1.981 metres. Since conversion to the metric system in 1923, the length as derived from the metre is precisely two metres, but the unit is neither part of nor recognized by the modern International metric system (SI).

As with many terms normally written in the Thai alphabet, romanization of Thai causes spelling variants such as waa and wah.

See also
Thai units of measurement
Orders of magnitude (area) for a comparison with other lengths

References

External links
 Area metric conversion, British and U.S., Japanese, Chinese, Thai, old French, others.

Units of length
Human-based units of measurement
Thai units of measurement